The Republic of the Congo national handball team is the national handball team of Congo.

African Championship record

Red border color indicates tournament was held on home :soil.

External links
IHF profile

Men's national handball teams
Handball